Paul Catanese is an American author and advertising writer that writes under the pseudonym P. W. Catanese. Catanese is best known for his Books of Umber series, which has been mostly well received. As a teenager, Catanese attended Trumbull High School in Trumbull, Connecticut, later attending the University of Connecticut and taking a job with an advertising company in Glastonbury, Connecticut.

Bibliography

Books of Umber
Happenstance Found (2006)   
Dragon Games (2009) 
The End of Time (2010)

Further Tales Adventures
The Brave Apprentice (2004) 
The Eye of the Warlock (2004)
The Thief and the Beanstalk (2005) 
The Mirror’s Tale (2005)
The Riddle of the Gnome (2006)

References

External links 

 

Living people
Writers from New York (state)
American children's writers
People from Trumbull, Connecticut
Year of birth missing (living people)